The Balelec Festival is a large musical event organised by students in Europe. It is usually the first open-air music festival happening in Switzerland each year during Spring. It is organised by volunteers on the campus of École Polytechnique Fédérale de Lausanne (EPFL) near the lake Geneva in Lausanne, Switzerland around the beginning of May.

Originally the ball of the school's electronics faculty, the festival is known to happen on a rainy day. It has been held at EPFL since 1981. Each year on a Friday night the school welcomes 15'000 people (since 2003) and 30 live concerts.  Concerns about excessive consumption of alcohol at the festival are denied by the organizers.

In 2015 and again in 2016, the festival once again attracted a sold out crowd of about 15,000 spectators. The budget for the 2016 festival was 650,000 swiss francs.

The association 

The Balelec Festival is a student association listed as a non-profit organization. A part of the funds to mount the festival comes from sponsorships and the other part comes from the tickets sold for the event. The student association has an overall budget of 800'000 CHF . All the money earned during the event is used to fund the next edition.

The association is composed of a main committee of 50 volunteers, mostly EPFL and UNIL students, who are divided into four teams: Animation, Logistics, Promotion and Internal Resources.  In addition, more than 300 volunteers and professional staff help with the setup on campus during the week preceding the event. On site, there are seven musical indoor and outdoor stages and about 30 live concerts each the year.

Outdoor stages 

The main live stages of the festival are outdoors. These 2 stages are called the Grande Scene (the main stage) and the Scene Azimuts. The main stage has an eclectic musical line-up while the other one is more rock/metal oriented. In 2012, the volume on these outdoor stages led to complaints from  neighbouring residents, leading to a reduction in the volume of the bass frequencies in 2013.

Indoor stages 

Indoor, the festival owns 4 scenes. The Satellite Scene is a live stage put in place with the collaboration of another EPFL student association called Satellite. Its line-up is oriented toward chanson française and balkan music. The festival has also two electronic music stages called the Coupole and the SoundGate, the last one taking place in the Faculty of Architecture's hall. The last indoor scene is called the Dome with a nightclub ambiance.

References

External links 

EPFL's internal newspaper's article about the historic of the festival from 2000 to 2005 (in french)
the Balelec Festival is a member of the Swiss association Petzi
EPFL's website

See also 

EPFL
Satellite

Student culture
Music festivals in Switzerland
Music festivals established in 1981